Estonian Cup 2000–01 was the ninth season of the Estonian football knockout tournament.

Quarterfinals
The first legs were played on April 11, 2001, and the second legs on April 22–23, 2001.

|}

Semifinals
The first legs were played on May 2, 2001, and the second legs on May 16, 2001.

|}

Final

External links
 RSSSF

Estonian Cup seasons
Estonian Cup 2000-01
2000–01 European domestic association football cups